Obaidullah
was elected to represent Kandahar Province in Afghanistan's Wolesi Jirga, the lower house of its National Legislature, in 2005.
A report on Kandahar prepared at the Navy Postgraduate School
stated he was a high school graduate,
that he served on the Economic committee, and that there was a controversy in his election.

One of the two vice-presidential running mates of Abdul Majid Samim, during Afghanistan's 2009 Presidential election, was named Obaidullah.

References

Living people
Members of the House of the People (Afghanistan)
Year of birth missing (living people)